10 is the tenth album by Turkish singer Tarkan. It was released on 15 June 2017 by HITT Production and distributed by DMC.

Release and content 
Tarkan's tenth studio album, 10, is a Turkish pop album. It contains 14 songs in total. The album sold 330,000 copies in 20 days and earned the singer 32 million.

Track listing

Charts

Sales

Release history

References 

2017 albums
Tarkan (singer) albums
Turkish-language albums